The Grisha class, Soviet designation Project 1124 Al'batros, are a series of anti-submarine corvettes built by the Soviet Union between 1970 and 1990 and later by Russia and Ukraine. These ships have a limited range and are largely used only in coastal waters. They have been equipped with a variety of ASW weapons and an SA-N-4 'Gecko' surface-to-air missile launcher. All were fitted with retractable fin stabilizers.

The designation "corvette" for these ships was a conditional adaptation as the Soviet classification was a small anti-submarine ship (MPK). In the Russian Navy, the Grishas are expected to be partially replaced by the Steregushchiy-class corvette.

Variants

 Grisha I (1124.1) – 12 ships built between 1970 and 1974 and decommissioned by 1999
 The Grisha II class (1124P) were built for the KGB border guard and marked with P for pogranichnyi meaning "on the border". This class was built only in Zelenodolsk and Vladivostok. These ships had a second 57 mm gun mounting replacing the SA-N-4 missile system forward. 17 ships were built in the 1970s. Two were transferred to the Ukrainian Navy and some may remain in service with the Russian Maritime Border Guard.
 The Grisha III class (1124 2nd batch) were built in the late 1970s to early 1980s. These ships incorporated several small scale modifications, including a 30 mm gun and new electronics. Thirty four units were built. Two ships were in service with the Lithuanian Navy until 2009. 
 A single Grisha IV class (1124K) ship was built in Zelenodolsk. This ship was a test ship for the SA-N-9 missile system and later was decommissioned.
 The Grisha V class (1124 M, 1124.4) ships were built between 1985 and 1994. This incorporated further modifications with the twin 57 mm guns being replaced by a single 76 mm gun. Thirty ships were built. 
 The Grisha V class (1124MU) ships were Ukrainian ships built after the dissolution of the Soviet Union among which is  that entered service in 2006 with the Ukrainian Navy.
 Currently on the RF ships are being modernized "Tornado 2" combat complex for antisubmarine "Zapad" type missiles firing.
 As of 2021, some twenty Grishas (mostly Grisha IIIs) remain active in the Russian Navy.

Ships

Gallery

See also
List of ships of the Soviet Navy
List of ships of Russia by project number

References

  Also published as 
 
 

Corvette classes
Corvettes of the Lithuanian Naval Force
Corvettes of the Russian Navy
Corvettes of the Soviet Navy
Corvettes of the Ukrainian Navy
Cold War corvettes of the Soviet Union